Christopher Knapp is a member of the Wyoming House of Representatives.

Career
Knapp is a business owner. Knapp served as a Campbell County commissioner from 2001 to 2012. In 2014, Knapp unsuccessfully ran in the Republican for the Wyoming House of Representatives seat representing the 53rd district, losing to Roy Edwards. On November 2, 2020, the day before the a general election in which Edwards ran unopposed, he died in office from complications related to COVID-19. On November 23, 2020, Knapp was unanimously appointed by the Campbell County commissioners to fill the vacancy left by Edwards' death. He was sworn into this position on December 4, 2020.

References

Living people
Businesspeople from Wyoming
County commissioners in Wyoming
Republican Party members of the Wyoming House of Representatives
People from Campbell County, Wyoming
21st-century American politicians
Year of birth missing (living people)